Fuchsia summa is a species of plant in the family Onagraceae. It is endemic to Ecuador: Loja. Found on the road from Yangana to Cerro Toledo in open patches above the tree line at elevations from 3,100  to 3,450 meters. It forms a low shrub to one half meter tall. The dark-green, subcoriaceous leaves are densely packed along the stems. The tube and sepals are four-angled. The sepals are slightly shorter than the petals and have green tips.

Sources

Endemic flora of Ecuador
summa
Vulnerable plants
Taxonomy articles created by Polbot